Victor Axel Westerholm (4 January 1860 Turku – 19 November 1919 Turku) was a Finnish landscape painter, especially known for founding the Önningeby artists' colony.

Biography
Victor Axel Westerholm was born in Turku in 1860. He was the son  of Viktor Westerholm, a ship's master, and Maria Westerholm (née Andersson). As a child he spent a lot of time at the island of Nagu in the Finnish Archipelago. From 1869 to 1878 he studied at the Finnish Art Society's Drawing School in Turku, under Robert Wilhelm Ekman (1808–1873) and Thorsten Waenerberg (1846–1917); and as a young man he studied under Eugen Dücker (1841–1916)  in Düsseldorf from 
1878-1880. Much later he studied under Jules Joseph Lefebvre(1836–1911) at the Académie Julian in Paris from 1888-1890.

In 1888 he became a teacher at the school of the Society of Art in Turku, and in 1891 became the director of the Turku art museum.

He often painted winter landscapes and sunsets at his summer home, "Tomtebo",  at the village of Önningeby  in the Municipality of Jomala on Åland in the Baltic Sea. In 1886, he invited several artists to Tomtebo thus beginning the Önningeby artists' colony (Önningebykolonin). Visiting artists who spent time in Önningeby include J.A.G. Acke, Hanna Rönnberg, Elin Danielson-Gambogi, Edvard Westman and Elias Muukka. Since 1992 Önningeby-museet  in Önningeby has exhibited  a permanent exhibition of works by the Önningeby artists’ colony.

Westerholm was an instructor at Turku drawing school in 1887–1898 and 1904–1917. In 1891, he was elected as the curator of the newly formed Art Association in Turku.

Personal life

In 1885, he married Hilma Alander. They had one daughter, . Westerholm lived in Turku where he died in November 1919 from a flu that turned into pneumonia.

Works

See also
Golden Age of Finnish Art
Finnish art

Notes

References

External links

1919 deaths
1860 births
19th-century Finnish painters
20th-century Finnish painters
Finnish male painters
19th-century Finnish male artists
20th-century Finnish male artists